Creontiades is a genus of plant bugs in the family Miridae. There are more than 50 described species in Creontiades.

Species
These 55 species belong to the genus Creontiades:

 Creontiades angulifer (Walker, 1873)
 Creontiades ater Poppius, 1915
 Creontiades bipunctatus Poppius, 1915
 Creontiades bouvieri Poppius, 1912
 Creontiades brevis Yasunaga, 1997
 Creontiades brunneus Poppius, 1914
 Creontiades castaneum Van Duzee, 1933
 Creontiades citrinus Carvalho, 1968
 Creontiades coloratus Poppius, 1912
 Creontiades coloripes Hsiao & Meng, 1963
 Creontiades debilis Van Duzee, 1915
 Creontiades dilutus (Stal, 1859)
 Creontiades elongatus (Lethierry, 1881)
 Creontiades erlangeri Poppius, 1912
 Creontiades fernandinus Carvalho, 1968
 Creontiades fruhstorferi Poppius, 1915
 Creontiades fuscosus Barber, 1925
 Creontiades grandis (Poppius, 1912)
 Creontiades hildebrandti Poppius, 1912
 Creontiades hirsutus (Poppius, 1910)
 Creontiades insularis Poppius, 1911
 Creontiades longicornis Poppius, 1912
 Creontiades maculicollis Poppius, 1915
 Creontiades marginatus Poppius, 1915
 Creontiades minutus Poppius, 1915
 Creontiades modiglianii Poppius, 1915
 Creontiades montanus Poppius, 1915
 Creontiades neavei Poppius, 1914
 Creontiades novaeguineae Poppius, 1915
 Creontiades orientalis Poppius, 1915
 Creontiades pacificus (Stal, 1859)
 Creontiades palauensis Carvalho, 1956
 Creontiades pallidus (Rambur, 1839)
 Creontiades philippinensis Yasunaga, 1998
 Creontiades plebejus Poppius, 1912
 Creontiades pulchricornis Poppius, 1912
 Creontiades punctatus Carvalho, 1968
 Creontiades purgatus (Stål, 1860)
 Creontiades ravana (Kirkaldy, 1909)
 Creontiades rubrinervis (Stål, 1862)
 Creontiades rugicollis Poppius, 1914
 Creontiades rusticus Poppius, 1912
 Creontiades samoanus Knight, 1935
 Creontiades signatus (Distant, 1884) (verde plant bug)
 Creontiades simillimus Poppius, 1912
 Creontiades subpellucidus Poppius, 1912
 Creontiades sumatrensis Poppius, 1915
 Creontiades suturalis (Poppius, 1910)
 Creontiades tellinii (Reuter, 1905)
 Creontiades uzeli Poppius, 1911
 Creontiades vittatus Carvalho, 1968
 Creontiades vitticollis Poppius, 1915
 Creontiades vittipennis Reuter, 1905
 Creontiades willowsi Van Duzee, 1933
 Creontiades yapensis Carvalho, 1956

References

Further reading

External links

 

Articles created by Qbugbot
Mirini